Acacia awestoniana, commonly known as the Stirling Range wattle, is a shrub of the genus Acacia and the subgenus Plurinerves.

Description
It blooms from September to November and produces yellow flowers. The simple inflorescences have globular flower heads with a diameter of  containing 54 to 60 golden flowers. The seed pods that form later are straight to narrowly oblong.

Distribution
It is native to a small area in the Great Southern region of Western Australia. The plant is found on the lower slopes, on flats and along watercourses and grows in loamy or sandy clay loamy soils. 

A. awestoniana is confined to a small area with the Stirling Range National Park and fewer than 1,000 individual plants are known to exist. It is usually found as a part of Eucalyptus woodland communities, associated species include Eucalyptus wandoo, Eucalyptus redacta and Acacia pulchella.

See also
 List of Acacia species

References

awestoniana
Acacias of Western Australia
Plants described in 1990
Taxa named by Bruce Maslin
Taxa named by Richard Sumner Cowan